Pölfing-Brunn is a municipality in the district of Deutschlandsberg in the Austrian state of Styria.

Population

References

Cities and towns in Deutschlandsberg District